Il lupo e l'agnello (The Wolf and the Lamb), also known as Le Coucou, is a 1980 Italian-French comedy film directed by Francesco Massaro.

Plot
Leo is a victim of constant complaints by his family, with his wife, Ivana, his two daughters, Ursula and Suni and her stepmother, Fanny, treating him like the dog house. A criminal nicknamed "Cuckoo", following a bloody robbery, finds refuge in Leon's house, and under the threat of a gun he will be able to cease reprimands and vexations against Leon.

Cast

 Tomas Milian: "Cuckoo"
 Michel Serrault: Leon De Paris
 Ombretta Colli: Ivana
 Laura Adani: Fanny  
 Giacomo Furia: Inspector
 Giuliana Calandra: Miss De Luca 
 Daniele Vargas: Colonel De Luca
 Patrizia Webley: Sonia

References

External links
 

1980 films
Italian comedy films
1980s Italian-language films
1980 comedy films
Films directed by Francesco Massaro
Films with screenplays by Michel Audiard
1980s Italian films